Victor Michael Dominello (born 30 July 1967 in Ryde, New South Wales), is an Australian politician who has been the New South Wales 
Minister for Customer Service in the second Berejiklian ministry since April 2019, and in the Perrottet ministry. Dominello is a member of the New South Wales Legislative Assembly, representing the electorate of Ryde for the Liberal Party since 2008.

He had previously served as the Minister for Finance, Services and Property in the first Berejiklian ministry between January 2017 and March 2019; as the Minister for Innovation and Better Regulation between April 2015 and January 2017 in the second Baird government; as the Minister for Citizenship, Communities and the Minister for Aboriginal Affairs between 2011 and 2015, and the Minister for Veterans Affairs and Assistant Minister for Education between 2014 and 2015, in the O'Farrell and first Baird governments.

After a career as a solicitor and local councillor, Dominello was elected to the Parliament of New South Wales following a Ryde by-election triggered by the resignation of his predecessor John Watkins. The by-election saw Dominello receive a two-party swing of 23.1 points. Dominello increased his margin at the 2011 election; however, the margin was reduced to 11.5 points at the 2015 state election.

Early life and career
Dominello was born at Ryde Hospital and was educated at Holy Spirit School (North Ryde) and Marist College (Eastwood). He went on to study law at Macquarie University. In 1991, he was admitted as a practitioner of the Supreme Court of New South Wales and the High Court of Australia after taking the solicitor's admission board examinations. In one of his first cases, Dominello represented applicants in the Maralinga cases, who sought compensation following the findings made by the Royal Commission into British nuclear tests in Australia. He successfully obtained an order that the limitation period be significantly extended to enable the applicants' claims to be maintained.

In 1994, Dominello commenced employment with Etheringtons Solicitors of North Sydney, and in 2000 became a partner. In the same year he represented applicants in complex proceedings in the Industrial Relations Commission of New South Wales, where staff members sought damages against members of Parliament and the Speaker of the New South Wales Legislative Assembly for unfair contract. Following his election to the Parliament of New South Wales in October 2008, Dominello stepped down as partner at Etheringtons.

Political career

Local government
He joined the Liberal Party in the early 1990s, and in 1995 Dominello was elected as a councillor for the City of Ryde. While on Council, Dominello was chair of a number of committees including the development committee and had a significant involvement in the establishment of the Ryde Aquatic Leisure Centre and the development of the Macquarie Business Park. Dominello served two terms, but did not nominate for the 2004 local government elections, citing his desire to concentrate on his legal career, and subsequently let his Liberal membership lapse.

New South Wales politics

On 3 September 2008, Labor Deputy Premier John Watkins, who was also the local Member for Ryde, resigned from parliament, resulting in the need for a by-election. Dominello nominated for preselection and won, defeating Ryde Mayor Vic Tagg and several other local party members.  On paper, Ryde was a safe Labor seat; Dominello needed a 10-percent swing to win it. However, it was located in territory that had historically been marginal at the federal level.  Additionally, the by-election came at a very bad time for the government, whose polling numbers had rapidly tailed off only a year after winning a fourth term.  Dominello went into the contest as the overwhelming favourite to win. He duly defeated Labor candidate Nicole Campbell in a landslide, receiving a swing of more than 25 points on the day of the by-election.  The swing, at the time the largest a sitting NSW government had ever suffered, turned Ryde into a safe Liberal seat in one stroke.  He was subsequently sworn as a member of the Legislative Assembly in on 25 October 2008.

Dominello has spoken in Parliament about a number of local issues including the future of Ryde Hospital, the Homebush V8 Supercar race and the increase to the Parking Space Levy.

Dominello won the seat in his own right at the 2011 state election, picking up a healthy swing of 12.7 points and increasing his vote to 75 percent, making Ryde the 10th-safest Liberal seat. Following the electoral victory of the O'Farrell government at that election, Dominello was appointed as the Minister for Citizenship, Communities and the Minister for Aboriginal Affairs. Due to the resignation of Barry O'Farrell as Premier, and the subsequent ministerial reshuffle by Mike Baird, the new Liberal Leader, in April 2014 in addition to his existing responsibilities as a minister, Dominello was appointed as the Minister for Veterans Affairs and the Assistant Minister for Education. Following the 2015 state election, Dominello was sworn in as the inaugural Minister for Innovation and Better Regulation in the second Baird government. In 2017 Dominello was appointed as the Minister for Finance, Services and Property in the first Berejiklian ministry. Following the 2019 state election, Dominello was sworn in as the Minister for Customer Service in the second Berejiklian ministry, with effect from 2 April 2019. Dominello was additionally appointed Minister for Digital on 31 March 2021.

Personal life and health
In September 2018, Dominello broke an arm while arm-wrestling NSW Attorney-General Mark Speakman in an office.

On 18 August 2021, while fronting the media in a press conference, Dominello's face was seen to be drooping and he was blinking slowly with his left eye. Concerned viewers contacted his office to urge him to seek medical help, which he did later that afternoon and was diagnosed with Bell's palsy. On subsequent days, he wore an eyepatch to prevent infection.

See also

First Baird ministry
Second Baird ministry
First Berejiklian ministry
Second Berejiklian ministry
Perrottet ministry

References

External links
Victor Dominello, NSW Liberal Party
Etheringtons Solicitors of North Sydney – Victor Dominello
State Electoral District – Ryde – New South Wales Electoral Commission
State Electoral District – Ryde Results 2008 By-election
 

Liberal Party of Australia members of the Parliament of New South Wales
Living people
Members of the New South Wales Legislative Assembly
1967 births
New South Wales local councillors
21st-century Australian politicians